Günther Csar (born 7 March 1966, in Zell am Ziller) is a former Austrian nordic combined skier who competed during the late 1980s and early 1990s. He won a bronze medal in the 3 x 10 km team event at the 1988 Winter Olympics in Calgary and also won a gold medal in the 3 x 10 km team event at the 1991 FIS Nordic World Ski Championships in Val di Fiemme.

External links 
 
 

1966 births
Living people
Austrian male Nordic combined skiers
Olympic Nordic combined skiers of Austria
Nordic combined skiers at the 1988 Winter Olympics
Nordic combined skiers at the 1992 Winter Olympics
Olympic bronze medalists for Austria
Olympic medalists in Nordic combined
FIS Nordic World Ski Championships medalists in Nordic combined
Medalists at the 1988 Winter Olympics
People from Schwaz District
Sportspeople from Tyrol (state)